Johan Ruijsink (born 21 December 1965) is a Dutch professional pool manager and coach, who captained both the European and American teams at the Mosconi Cup. After his first appearance at the Mosconi Cup, he captained the European team to draw the 2006 Mosconi Cup, and later won six events between 2007 and 2014, going undefeated as European captain. Ruijsink took over as American captain in 2017, and won the 2018 and 2019 Mosconi Cup events.

Ruijsink is the only non-playing captain to win the Mosconi Cup as a part of both the European and United States teams. Despite competing at 9 Mosconi Cup events, Ruijsink's only loss came as American captain to his European replacement Marcus Chamat at the 2017 Mosconi Cup.

Career
Ruijsink began coaching pool players in the early 90s, credited with empowering Netherlands' pool players, such as Niels Feijen and Alex Lely, and later Russian players such as Ruslan Chinachov and Konstantin Stepanov.

Ruijsink took control of the European team for the Mosconi Cup in 2007. The European team had won one event in the preceding ten years, but under Ruijsink won seven times between 2007 and 2014. In 2014, Ruijsink left his post as European captain, to be replaced by Swedish player Marcus Chamat.

Three years later for the 2017 event, Ruijsink would take over as captain of the American team, losing 4–11 to successor Chamat. The following year, leading the American team (alongside vice-captain Jeremy Jones), and would defeat Chamat, and win the 2018 Mosconi Cup 9–11
. He took charge of the American team once more in 2019 winning 11-9. Despite this, he was not invited to retain the position for the 2020 Mosconi Cup, being replaced by Jones.

Achievements
 Mosconi Cup 
Winner: 2007, 2010, 2011, 2012, 2013, 2014, 2018, 2019
 Drawn: 2006

References

External links
Johan Ruysink at propool.info

1965 births
Living people
Dutch pool players